Audrey Cady Scanlan is a bishop of the Episcopal Church. She was consecrated as the 11th and current bishop of the Episcopal Diocese of Central Pennsylvania on September 12, 2015.

Biography 
Scanlan was born in New York and later moved to Connecticut where she has lived for over 50 years. She received seminary education at the Yale Divinity School where she received a master's degree in theology in 2008. She continued her education at Hartford Seminary, receiving a Doctor of Ministry degree in 2013.

On March 14, 2015, Scanlan was elected to the post of Bishop of Central Pennsylvania, on the second ballot from a field of three candidates. She received 79 of 147 lay votes and 50 of 79 clergy votes (74 lay votes and 40 clergy votes were required for election). Scanlan succeeded the Right Reverend Nathan D. Baxter, who retired in May 2014 after serving as Bishop of Central Pennsylvania for eight years, as well as the Rt. Rev. Robert Gepert who had served as provisional bishop.

See also
 List of Episcopal bishops of the United States
 Historical list of the Episcopal bishops of the United States

References

Living people
Yale Divinity School alumni
Hartford Seminary alumni
Religious leaders from New York City
Year of birth missing (living people)
Episcopal bishops of Central Pennsylvania